The 1994 Connacht Senior Football Championship was the installment of the annual Connacht Senior Football Championship held under the auspices of Connacht GAA.

The winning team qualified for the 1994 All-Ireland Senior Football Championship.

Leitrim won their second title and their first since 1927.

Teams
The Connacht championship is contested by the five counties in the Irish province of Connacht and London.

Results
Quarter-finals

Semi-finals

Final

References

External links
 Living for football - The Martin McHugh story

2C
Connacht Senior Football Championship